Mardom Darreh is a village in Palizan Rural District, in the Central District of Maraveh Tappeh County, Golestan Province, Iran. At the 2006 census, its population was 108, in 26 families.

References 

Populated places in Maraveh Tappeh County